Bienvenido or bienvenidos may refer to:

Entertainment 
 Bienvenidos (album), a 2006 album by Cabezones
 Bienvenidos (Chilean TV series), a Chilean morning show
 "Bienvenido" (song), Spanish version of the 2011 song "Benvenuto" by Laura Pausini
 Bienvenidos (Venezuelan TV series), Venezuelan sketch comedy television show
 La historia de Bienvenido (Bienvenido's Story), a 1964 Spanish children's movie
 Bienvenido-Welcome, a 1994 film by Mexican director Gabriel Retes

People 
 Bienvenido Abante (born 1951), Filipino politician and pastor
 Bienvenido Cedeño (born 1969), Panamanian baseball player
 Bienvenido Fabián (1920–2000), Dominican composer active in the 1930s
 Bienvenido Fajemolin, Filipino trooper who received the Medal of Valor
 Bienvenido Granda (1915–1983), Cuban vocalist and musician
 Bienvenido Jiménez (born 1890), Cuban baseball player
 Bienvenido Lumbera (1932–2021), Filipino poet, critic and dramatist
 Bienvenido Marañón (born 1986), Spanish footballer 
 Bienvenido Zacu Mborobainchi (born 1956), Bolivian politician
 Bienvenido Nebres (born 1940), Filipino scientist, mathematician, and Jesuit
 Bienvenido Noriega Jr., Filipino playwright
 Bienvenido Reyes (born 1947), Filipino judge
 Bienvenido Rivera (born 1968), Dominican baseball player
 Bienvenido Santos (1911–1996), Filipino-American writer
 Hector Bienvenido Trujillo (1908–2002), Dominican general and president of the Dominican Republic 1952–1960
 Jacinto Bienvenido Peynado (1878–1940), president of the Dominican Republic 1938–1940

Places 
 Bienvenida, Badajoz, a municipality in Extremadura, Spain
 Bienvenido, Puebla, municipal seat of Hermenegildo Galeana, a municipality in Puebla, Mexico